Vatican City is itself of great cultural significance. Buildings such as St. Peter's Basilica and the Sistine Chapel are home to some of the most famous art in the world, which includes works by artists such as Botticelli, Bernini and Michelangelo. The Vatican Library and the collections of the Vatican Museums are of the highest historical, scientific and cultural importance. In 1984, the Vatican was added by UNESCO to the List of World Heritage Sites; it is the only one to consist of an entire country. 

The Vatican can be said to be the de facto custodian of the Latin language through its Latinitas Foundation. An important product of this foundation is the Latin lexicon of recent neologisms, the Lexicon Recentis Latinitatis.

The permanent population of the Vatican City is predominantly male, although two communities of nuns live in the Vatican. A minority are senior Catholic clergy, some are members of institutes of consecrated life, and the Swiss Guards make up an important segment. Many workers in Vatican City and embassy personnel accredited to the Holy See live outside its walls.

Tourism and pilgrimages are an important factor in the daily life in the Vatican. The Pope has weekly public audiences and celebrates public Mass and other services, and imparts his Urbi et Orbi blessing every Easter and Christmas, and immediately following his election as Pope. For significant events with large numbers of attendees, he concelebrates open-air Mass in Saint Peter's Square.

Dress code
A dress code is enforced for entry into St. Peter's Basilica. It is based on the standard for proper dress when visiting a Catholic church, with visitors being reminded that, although St. Peter's is an architectural and artistic monument, it is foremost a place of worship. 

The dress code prohibits:
hats on lay men inside the basilica
shorts/skirts above the knees
sleeveless shirts
shirts which contain profanity
excessive jewellery

The use of mobile phones inside the basilica is also prohibited, as is smoking.

Cuisine

The Vatican is a microstate, with only one restaurant, and the food there is very similar to Italian cuisine, especially Roman cuisine.  Workers in the Vatican provide many customers to restaurants in the rest of Rome. 

"Eggplant with Parmesan of the Swiss Guards", a mixture containing eggplant, parmesan and spices, is supposedly one distinctive dish.

Art

See also
The Papacy
The Vatican Splendors
College of Cardinals
Music of Vatican City
Sport in Vatican City
Index of Vatican City-related articles
Theatre state

References